Pre-construction services are used in planning a construction project before the actual construction begins. These services are often referred to as preconstruction or precon. It is a modern practice, considered to be part of construction project management, which is the overall planning, coordination, and control of a project from inception to completion aimed at meeting a client’s requirements in order to produce a functionally and financially viable project.

Overview
In the long established design-bid-build method of construction project delivery, a project would be entirely designed before being built. This resulted in a package of plans and specifications which formed the construction documents. The owner would then request bids (or tenders) for the project and award the project to a successful bidder, who would then build the project.

Often the early feasibility, studies, and design development is supported by construction cost estimators, who prepare cost estimates for use in the decision-making process. This process starts with planning, and is supported by conceptual or order-of-magnitude estimates. Design then starts with a schematic design (SD) stage, followed by a design development (DD) stage, and culminates in a construction document (CD) state.

In the design-bid-build system, there is a construction bidding process where the contractors’ construction cost estimators prepare the estimate and form the bid, based on the construction documents, in an intense pre-bid period, typically measured in weeks.

Pre-construction services grew out of construction cost estimating to encompass the other activities in planning a project. The intent is to work with the project’s owner to help deliver a satisfactory project that meets the owner’s objectives. In addition to estimating, the preconstruction team participates in design decisions, evaluations, studies, value engineering, value analysis, scheduling, constructability reviews, and more. Design costs, permitting, land acquisition, and life-cycle costs may also be evaluated. In delivering pre-construction services, general contractors or construction managers may also be negotiating for project construction services. Often this may be accomplished by agreeing on a guaranteed maximum price (GMP) for the project. The firm then delivers the project. Typically the owner and the firm share any cost savings realized during construction.

References

Construction management
Civil engineering